Jean-Luc Raharimanana (born June 26, 1967, Antananarivo, Madagascar) is a Malagasy novelist, essayist, poet, and playwright.

Personal life 
He wrote his first book in his native country, but he was unable to publish it because of the political situation. He went to France to study ethnolinguistics at the University of Paris and the Institut National des langues et civilisations orientales following his graduation from the University of Antananarivo in 1989, due to a stipendium he received from the RFI.

After completing his studies in France, Raharimanana went on to work as a journalist and French teacher.

In his works, Raharimanana often describes the situation of poverty and corruption and the history in his homeland in a violent and lyrical style. Several of his screenplays have been adapted for theatre and he is the subject of the 2004 documentary Gouttes d’encre sur l’île rouge.

Raharimanana's works have been translated into German, English, Italian, and Spanish. Raharimanana currently lives in Paris.

Selected works 
His first play "Le prophète et le président" won the Tchicaya-U'Tamsi Prize in 1990, awarded by the Inter-African theatre competition, but the theatre performance was banned by Madagascar's government owing to the political nature of the play.

In June 2002, Raharimana's father Vénance Raharimanana, a history professor at the University of Antananarivo, was tortured and subsequently arrested following a radio program he hosted that dealt with the pre-colonial tension in Madagascar. He writes about the experience in his short story collection L'arbre anthropophage.

Bibliography

Novellas 

 Le lépreux et dix-neuf autres nouvelles. Paris: Hatier, 1992.
 Lucarne. Paris: Le Serpent à plumes, 1996.
 Rêves sous le linceul. Paris: Le Serpent à plumes, 1998.

Children's books 

 Landisoa and the three pebbles. Illustrations by Jean A. Ravelona. Vanves: Édicef / Hachette, 2001.

Novels 

 Za. Paris: Philippe Rey, 2008.
 Nour, 1947. Paris: Le Serpent à Plumes, 2001; La Roque d’Anthéron: Vents d’Ailleurs, 2017.
 Revenir. Paris: Rivages, 2018.

Stories

Collections 

 L’Arbre anthropophage. Paris: Gallimard/Joëlle Losfeld, 2004.
 Tsiaron’ny nofo. Îlle-sur-Tête: K’A, 2008.

Stories contributed to collections 

 "Anja" in Une enfance outremer. Paris: Seuil, 2001.
 "Prosper" in Dernières nouvelles de la Françafrique. La Roque d’Anthéron: Vents d’Ailleurs, 2003.
 "Corps en jachère" in Nul n’est une île: Solidarité Haïti. Montréal: Mémoire d’encrier, 2004.
 "Sortir des bois" in Africultures 59 (Second Trimester 2004)
 "Le vol de La Tempête" in Enfances. Bertoua (Cameroun): Ndzé, 2006; Paris: Ndzé (Pocket), 2008.
 "Za" in Le huitième péché, collectif coordonné par Kangni Alem. Bertoua (Cameroun): Éditions Ndzé, 2006.
 "Pacification" in Dernières nouvelles du colonialisme (Collectif). La Roque d’Anthéron: Vents d’Ailleurs, 2006.
 "Le creuset des possibles" in Pour une littérature-monde, sous la direction de Michel Le Bris et Jean Rouaud. Paris: Gallimard, 2007.
 "Sur le bord des lèvres" in Riveneuve Continents 5 (Autumn 2007)
 "De là où j’écris" in Riveneuve Continents 10 (Winter 2009-2010)

Poetry 

 Les cauchemars du gecko. La Roque d’Anthéron: Vents d’Ailleurs, 2011.
 Enlacement(s). Coffret de trois livres: Des Ruines, Obscena et Il n’y a plus de pays. La Roque d’Anthéron: Vents d’Ailleurs, 2012.
 Empreintes. La Roque d’Anthéron: Vents d’Ailleurs, 2015.

Academic publications 

 La littérature malgache. Interculturel Francophonies (Lecce, Italie) 1 (June–July 2001)
 Identités, langues et imaginaires dans l’Océan Indien. Interculturel Francophonies 4 (November–December 2003)
 Jacques Rabemananjara. Interculturel Francophonies 11 (June–July 2007)
 Les Comores, une littérature en archipel (co-authored with Magali Nirina Marson). Interculturel Francophonies 19 (June–July 2011)

Theatre adaptations

Film adaptations

Awards 

 1987 - Jean-Joseph Rabearivelo Award for Poetry
 1989 - Tardivat International Award For Best French Language Fiction 
 1990 - Tchicaya-U'Tamsi Prize for African Poetry
 1998 - Great Fiction Prize of Madagascar (ADELF), for Rêves sous le linceul.
 2011 - Salon du Livre insulaire de Ouessant Poetry Award, for Les cauchemars du gecko.
 2018 - Prix Jacques Lacarrière for Revenir.

External links
 Raharimanana, biography by Magali Compan-Barnard (in French) and bibliography, with audio recording ("île en île").
 Extrait (Revue Noire).
 La pièce sur PARIS!!!!
  Association soutenant Raharimanana

References 

1967 births
Living people
Malagasy writers
Malagasy male writers
20th-century male writers
21st-century male writers
People from Antananarivo
Malagasy expatriates in France
French-language writers from Madagascar
University of Paris alumni
University of Antananarivo alumni
Malagasy-language writers